Understanding Lung Sounds 3rd edition (2002) by Steven Lehrer is a book and audio CD that guides the student through the skills of lung auscultation. It provides a complete overview of lung examination, anatomy, physiology, and pathology. The audio CD presents and explains normal and abnormal lung sounds.

References

External links
 Understanding Lung Sounds on Google Books

Pulmonology
Respiratory therapy
Audible medical signs
Symptoms and signs: Respiratory system